The 2005 Mount Union Purple Raiders football team was an American football team that represented the University of Mount Union in the Ohio Athletic Conference (OAC) during the 2005 NCAA Division III football season. In their 20th year under head coach Larry Kehres, the Purple Raiders compiled a 14–1 record, won the OAC championship, advanced to the NCAA Division III playoffs, and defeated , 35–28, in the Stagg Bowl to win the Division III national championship.

The team played its home games at Mount Union Stadium in Alliance, Ohio.

Schedule

References

Mount Union
Mount Union Purple Raiders football seasons
NCAA Division III Football Champions
Mount Union Purple Raiders football